Chris Stokes  is an American filmmaker and former record executive. He is the son of actress Irene Stokes and older brother of singer Juanita Stokes. He is perhaps best known for being the founder of The Ultimate Group record label in 2000, whose roster included B2K, Omarion, Jhené Aiko, Marques Houston, IMx and NLT, among others.

Transition to film and television
Stokes first became connected with film and television through the talent he managed. In 1992, Marques Houston made his acting debut in the animated comedy film Bébé's Kids, and received his big break as a regular on Sister, Sister in 1994. All three members of Immature appeared in the film House Party 3 (1994).

His first film credit came in 2001 as the writer and director of House Party 4, which starred Immature, which by then had transitioned to their new name IMx. He is perhaps most well known as the writer and director of the 2004 dance movie You Got Served, starring members of his TUG record label. The cast included Lil' Kim and Marques Houston. The film opened at #1 at the box office during Super Bowl weekend with $16 million grossed in its first week.

He also wrote and directed Somebody Help Me and Somebody Help Me 2, two horror films. The first, Somebody Help Me, was released to DVD on November 13, 2007, and made a television premiere on BET on Halloween 2007. Both were distributed by Vivendi. The company's second feature, No Vacancy, another horror, was completed in 2011 and the first of Stokes' films not star talent from his music career. It was distributed by Grindstone / Lionsgate Home Entertainment.

Also in 2011, Stokes returned to the dance battle genre with the dance-drama Battlefield America, starring Marques Houston, Gary Anthony Sturgis, and Lynn Whitfield. The film follows a young businessman whose community service obligations require him to turn a group of misfit kids into a dance team.

In 2018 it was announced Chris Stokes signed a 3-picture deal with Viacom, "We Belong Together", "Running Out of Time", and "Fall Girls". "We Belong Together" launched BET Network's original movie franchise by premiering simultaneously on BET and BET Her, produced by Chris Stokes' Footage Films production company.  In August 2019, BET+ announced a new legal thriller "Sacrifice", to be written, directed, and produced by Chris Stokes through his Footage Films production company, and starring Paula Patton. In May 2020, Stokes' new musical series "Howard High", starring Marques Houston debuts on subscription-based platform UrbanflixTV.

In 2020, BET+ acquired "Trigger", directed by Stokes. It is set to be released this summer as a BET Original on their streaming platform. Also this summer, BET picked up thriller "Always and Forever", directed by Stokes and starring Lauren London, Cynthia Addai-Robinson, Deborah Ayorinde, Rocsi Diaz, Wood Harris and Loretta Devine. In September 2020, BET+ announced that it would turn its original film "Sacrifice" into a series, ordering 10 episodes to be written, directed, and produced by Stokes.

Chris Stokes announced in 2021 that Footage Films was greenlit to produce a new series, Foster Law, for the emerging black streaming network UrbanFlix.

Filmography

Christopher Brian Collection
In 2007, Stokes launched a clothing and fashion line, the Christopher Brian Collection, which debuted at Magic (trade show) in Las Vegas February 2007. The line featured Kim Kardashian as the principal spokesmodel and was available at Dash, her Calabassas boutique. Promotional images for the brand featured topless pictures of Kim Kardashian wearing just the Christopher Brian pants.

References

External links
 
 Official Chris Stokes
 Chris Stokes Entertainment
 Footage Films Official Site
 Chris Stokes directing 1st of 3 picture deal with Viacom
 
 

African-American film directors
Film producers from California
American music video directors
Record producers from California
Living people
Film directors from Los Angeles
21st-century African-American people
20th-century African-American people
Converts to Jehovah's Witnesses
Year of birth missing (living people)